Paolo Coloni (born 24 May 1969) is an Italian racing driver. He is currently team principal at Coloni Motorsport, a motor racing team founded in 1981 by his father, Enzo Coloni. He has competed in such series as the German Formula Three Championship and the Italian Formula Three Championship. He finished in second-place in the Masters of Formula 3 race of 1993.

References

External links
 

1969 births
Living people
Italian racing drivers
Italian Formula Three Championship drivers
German Formula Three Championship drivers

Abt Sportsline drivers
Scuderia Coloni drivers